Regan Lee Smith (born September 23, 1983) is an American professional stock car racing driver and a pit reporter for Fox NASCAR. He most recently drove part-time in the NASCAR Xfinity Series, driving the No. 8 Chevrolet Camaro SS for JR Motorsports.

Early career
Son of M.P.H. Racing owners Ron and Lee Smith, Smith grew up in Cato, New York, and began his racing career at the age of four, when he began racing go-karts and microds. Over the next several years, he won numerous regional and state championships. In 1995, he and his family moved to Mooresville, North Carolina, to allow Smith to advance his career. He joined the World Karting Association and continued to win, joining the factory-supported team owned by Enzo Chiovitti in 1998. That same year, he began competing in the Allison Legacy Series.

In 2001, he began driving in the USAR Hooters Pro Cup Series, winning four consecutive poles.

NASCAR

2002–2004
Smith began his NASCAR career racing in the Craftsman Truck Series in 2002. He made his debut at the age of 18 driving the No. 63 Ford F-150 for MB Motorsports at South Boston Speedway. He qualified 28th and finished 29th at South Boston and finished 30th at Phoenix after starting twelfth in that race. He also made his Busch Series debut at Memphis Motorsports Park for Ed Whitaker, starting 16th but finishing 39th after a wreck.

Smith moved to the Busch Series in 2003 for a full-time ride with Bost Motorsports. Despite a lack of major sponsorship, Smith had three top twenty finishes. However, the underfunded team opted for other drivers halfway through the year, forcing Smith out of work. He drove one race for Innovative Motorsports at Pikes Peak International Raceway, finishing 40th after early mechanical failures forced him to exit the race on the second lap. He also drove for Mac Hill Motorsports in the Ford 300, finishing 28th.

Smith continued to drive for Mac Hill in various Busch races in 2004, his best finish coming at Nashville Superspeedway, where he finished 24th. Following his release from the team, he was hired to drive the No. 50 Enzyte Chevrolet Monte Carlo for Michael Holigan for three races and appeared in a few episodes of The Reality of Speed on Spike, his best finish 26th at Chicagoland Speedway, before that team suspended operations. After a fifteenth-place finish at Pikes Peak for Phoenix Racing, he posted his best NASCAR finish to date at Homestead-Miami Speedway in the Truck Series, ninth in the No. 06 John Boy and Billy Chevy for MRD Motorsports.

2005–2007
Smith began the 2005 season with Xpress Motorsports's No. 19 team, but lost the ride after sponsorship failed to materialize. He was then hired as the driver of the No. 65 Glynn Motorsports Dodge Ram and in four races in the truck he had a 20th at Texas and a pair of 22nds at Mansfield and Dover, and after that was elevated to Glynn's Busch Series team. Originally unsponsored, the team garnered sponsorships from Who's Your Daddy? and Samson Stone. Despite a streak of six races where he did not qualify worse than twelfth, including three thirteenth-place runs, he was released from the team. He ended the year in the Truck Series MRD for the closing races of the season, finishing 29th, 33rd, and 32nd in three late season starts for that team.

At the end of the 2005 season, Smith signed on with Team Rensi Motorsports to run a full Busch season for 2006, with his best finish of tenth coming at Charlotte Speedway. Smith ended the season with one top ten as well as a number of other strong finishes, and ended the season 20th overall in points. Towards the end of the season Smith tested for Ginn Racing at Kentucky, and signed a deal with them to run the full Busch season, and also sixteen cup races which, would come in a car shared with Mark Martin for the 2007 season.

2007–2008

Smith attempted his first career Cup race at the 2007 Daytona 500, in a fourth car, numbered 39, for Ginn Racing. He failed to qualify.

Smith made his official Nextel Cup debut at the Food City 500 at Bristol Motor Speedway, finishing 25th in NASCAR's first Car of Tomorrow race. Smith made six starts in the No. 01 sharing ride with Mark Martin. He was removed from the No. 01 on July 17, 2007, and moved to the No. 14 after the release of Sterling Marlin, but before the team could run a race Ginn Racing merged with Dale Earnhardt, Inc. As a result, the No. 14 team's owner points were transferred to DEI's No. 15 team and Smith was out of a ride for the 2007 season, allowing him to keep his rookie status for 2008 (only six starts). He then moved to the Craftsman Truck series to drive the No. 47 for Morgan-Dollar Motorsports for starting at O'Reilly Raceway Park.

Smith returned to the No. 01 for 2008 as its sole driver, with Martin moving over to the No. 8. The team operated with little to no sponsorship (Principal Financial Group was the main sponsor), but managed to stay in business the entire season. Smith lost out his first win at Talladega Superspeedway because on the final lap, in the trioval, he passed Tony Stewart for first place, but it was announced that Smith went below the yellow line when he made the pass; the victory was given to Stewart. Smith said that he was pushed down by Stewart.

Despite finishing the season with no top ten finishes in 34 races (he was removed for both road course races), Smith won the 2008 Sprint Cup Rookie of the Year award, beating out Sam Hornish Jr.  He became the first rookie driver in Sprint Cup history to finish every race entered in his rookie season.

2009–2010 
After the 2008 season, DEI shut down the No. 01 after merging with Chip Ganassi Racing's NASCAR operation and Smith was released. On January 14, 2009, he signed with Furniture Row Racing to drive the No. 78 for its part-time 2009 slate of races. He made eighteen of twenty attempts with the team, and was hired to drive for the team full-time in 2010, with the team being offered Richard Childress Racing chassis and Hendrick Motorsports engines.

In 2010, he did not score any top tens. His best finish was twelfth (twice) but still finished 28th in the point standings, his best of his career.  The team changed engine providers, becoming a user of Earnhardt-Childress Racing Technologies (a joint venture of his former DEI team and Childress Racing) engines for the 2011 season, with Stewart-Haas Racing offering pit crews.

2011–2013

At the 2011 Daytona 500, Smith returned to the No. 78 car. Smith finished seventh after crashing in the final laps while battling for the lead. Although disappointing, he was able to come back and finish seventh in the first top ten finish of his Cup Series career and for Furniture Row Racing.

On May 7, 2011, at the Showtime Southern 500 at Darlington Raceway, Smith won his first Sprint Cup race, holding off Carl Edwards at the end. On a late caution, Smith stayed out on older tires while Edwards and most of the lead lap cars pitted for fresh right side tires.  Smith fended off Edwards for two restarts to claim the first cup win of his career at Darlington Raceway. Smith in recalling the Talladega race he lost in 2008 said he was not worried about it anymore, and said the Darlington win meant more to him than what he would have experienced at Talladega. The win was somewhat overshadowed by a post-race altercation between Kyle Busch and Kevin Harvick.  It was only the second time a driver had won his first Sprint Cup race at Darlington Raceway, the first being Lake Speed in 1988.

At the 2011 Brickyard 400, Smith had enough fuel to end with a solid 3rd-place finish by passing Jamie McMurray on the last lap, for his second top five of 2011. His former teammate Paul Menard ended up winning the race. Also a strong run at New Hampshire Motor Speedway proved that Smith was ready for the Sprint Cup Series with another top ten position. At the fall race at Talladega Superspeedway, Smith was accidentally turned by Mark Martin and smashed extremely hard head on into the wall. Smith was able to walk away from the crash uninjured but said the crash was one of his hardest wrecks in his career.

In 2012 when the Daytona 500 frustrated many fans and NASCAR officials because of a long rain delay on the planned date, a rain delay in the morning, and then the bizarre fire red flag delay caused by Juan Pablo Montoya's crash into a jet dryer in turn 3 on lap 160, Smith told the public he was so happy and excited for the first time in his career to leave Daytona that night. Smith had been involved in a crash on lap 188 involving several other drivers, but was able to continue on the lead lap.

At the 2012 Irwin Tools Night Race, Smith had gotten through two cautions that resulted in Ryan Newman and Tony Stewart crashing out of the race until he ended up spinning Danica Patrick away from a top ten finish. Patrick crashed head-on and when climbing out of her car, before leaving with officials she thought about tossing her helmet at Smith's car like Stewart had done to Matt Kenseth previously in the past caution, but instead vented her anger/fury by wagging her finger at him when he came by to lap her down. After the race Smith maintained that he did not intentionally crash her while Patrick believed he did and both left Bristol without any penalties.

It was announced on September 24, 2012, that Smith would not be returning to Furniture Row Racing for the 2013 season. He was replaced by Kurt Busch. In his last start for FRR, in the fall race at Talladega, Smith had a fifth-place finish after clearing a 23-car crash in turn 4 on the last lap.

Smith was set to finish the 2012 season by swapping rides with Busch, with Busch taking over Smith's No. 78 and Smith taking over the unsponsored No. 51 Chevrolet at Phoenix Racing, but Smith was announced on October 11, 2012, as the replacement driver for Dale Earnhardt Jr. in the works team's No. 88 Chevrolet for the Charlotte and Kansas Chase races after Earnhardt was diagnosed with a concussion after his testing crash at Kansas Speedway in August and after involvement in the same last lap crash during the Good Sam Club 500 at Talladega on October 7, 2012, so for these two races, Smith was replaced in the No. 51 by A. J. Allmendinger.  Qualifying 26th and performing well during both practice sessions, Smith had a top ten car before the engine failed for the first time on the No. 88 team in the season, and finished the race in the 38th position. In the following race at Kansas, Smith performed well, and managed to muster a top ten finish. Earnhardt returned to the 88 at Martinsville. Allmendinger would drive the No. 51 at Martinsville and Texas, while Smith drove the car at Phoenix and Homestead. On November 17, Smith won the Ford EcoBoost 300 in the NASCAR Nationwide Series driving the No. 5 Hendrickcars.com Chevy for JR Motorsports. It is his first career NASCAR Nationwide Series win in his first and only start of 2012. Prior to the win at Homestead Miami, his last start came in 2007.

For 2013, Smith returned to the Nationwide Series, driving the No. 7 for JR Motorsports. On the final lap at the season-opening DRIVE4COPD 300 at Daytona, Smith was leading while heading into the final turn, but when he attempted to block Brad Keselowski, but then spun up the track, causing a 12-car crash that injured 28 fans. On May 4, Smith got his second Nationwide Series victory at the Aaron's 312 at Talladega; Smith, Joey Logano and Kasey Kahne were racing three-wide to the finish, and despite Kahne crossing first, Smith had been the leader at the time of the caution coming out. At Michigan's Nationwide race, Smith took the lead with 13 laps remaining after Parker Kligerman pitted, and Smith held off Kyle Larson for his third Nationwide victory. On September 6, Smith stepped into the No. 48 Hendrick Motorsports car for Jimmie Johnson in practice and qualifying for the Federated Auto Parts 400 at Richmond, since Johnson was awaiting his second child's birth.

Smith finished third in the 2013 NASCAR Nationwide Series standings, behind Austin Dillon and Sam Hornish Jr.; he was named the series' Most Popular Driver at the season-ending awards banquet.

2014

Smith won the season-opening DRIVE4COPD 300 at Daytona.

On May 24, Smith was tabbed as standby driver for the No. 24 Hendrick Motorsports car of Jeff Gordon in the event Gordon did not run the Coca-Cola 600 due to back spasms. Gordon would run the full 600 miles. On August 10, Smith was hired to replace Tony Stewart in the Cheez-It 355 at The Glen after Stewart hit and killed a driver during a sprint car race the previous day.

Smith nearly swept the Daytona Nationwide races by nearly winning the Subway Jalapeño 250. He got edged at the start-finish line by teammate Kasey Kahne in a photo-finish. The spring Daytona race was proven to be Smith's only win of 2014. He finished second in the championship standings to teammate Chase Elliott who clinched the championship during the autumn race at Phoenix.

2015

Smith was picked up by Stewart-Haas Racing to drive the No. 41 Haas Automation car, upon the indefinite suspension of its normal driver Kurt Busch. It marked the second time in seven months that Smith replaced a SHR driver (the other being when he replaced Stewart at Watkins Glen in 2014). Upon Busch's reinstation, Smith did not return to the Cup Series until the STP 500, when Smith replaced Kyle Larson in the No. 42 Target car of Chip Ganassi Racing after Larson had fainted the day before the race.

In the Xfinity Series race at Daytona, he flipped over for the first time in his career causing him to finish 35th.

On August 8, at Watkins Glen, Smith started a fight against Ty Dillon when Dillon dumped him in turn one costing him in a great finish. On August 15, Smith won the Nationwide Children's Hospital 200, at Mid-Ohio Sports Car Course, passing the leader, Alex Tagliani, in the last lap after slight contact while racing for the lead. On October 3, Smith won his second race in 2015 at Dover, after holding off Kyle Busch and Denny Hamlin.

On October 17, Smith stated that he would not return to JR Motorsports for 2016 and expected to join a team that is competing in the Cup Series in 2016. It was announced on October 28 that Justin Allgaier would bring a Brandt sponsorship and drive the No. 7 in 2016.

2016

Smith returned to the Cup Series in 2016, driving the No. 7 for Tommy Baldwin Racing, a few hours after Alex Bowman was released from the ride.
He started his season with a solid 8th-place finish in the Daytona 500. He had a dismal spring and summer showing with his best finish in 16 starts being 23rd, at Fontana. He later rebounded at the 2016 Pennsylvania 400 with a third-place finish, matching the best finish in the history of TBR set by Dave Blaney at the 2011 Good Sam Club 500. Smith ran the full 2016 schedule for TBR with the exception of the Teenage Mutant Ninja Turtles 400, for which he was replaced by Ty Dillon as he flew to North Carolina to await the birth of his child.

Smith lost his ride after it was announced on November 17 that Tommy Baldwin Racing would no longer compete full-time after the season was over.

2017
On February 8, 2017, Smith joined RBR Enterprises to run 10–12 races in the Truck Series. In May, Smith replaced an injured Aric Almirola in the Richard Petty Motorsports' No. 43 car for the Monster Energy Open, the qualifying event for the Monster Energy NASCAR All-Star Race. A week later, Smith drove the No. 43 in the Coca-Cola 600. Darrell Wallace Jr. took over the No. 43 at Pocono onwards.

In June, Smith became a color commentator for Fox NASCAR broadcast of the Xfinity Series race at Iowa Speedway.
In August, Smith joined Joe Gibbs Racing's Xfinity team on a one race deal at Mid-Ohio.

On November 29, 2017, Fox NASCAR announced Smith would become a pit reporter for Cup and Xfinity races in 2018.

2018
On September 6, 2018, it was announced by Leavine Family Racing that Smith would be driving the No. 95 Chevrolet as a substitute for Kasey Kahne starting at the Brickyard 400. Smith has three top-20 finishes and a 10th-place finish with that coming at the fall Talladega race. Smith received the blessing of his Fox NASCAR superiors to take the ride with LFR. He said during the LFR stint that he never considers himself retired when looking for a ride, just not in the seat. Smith said that working the 2018 season on television helped him to know the entire NASCAR community better because he was not bound by team alliances anymore and could talk to anyone in the garage.

Personal life
Smith is an avid fan of the Carolina Hurricanes and the Denver Broncos.

Smith married Megan Mayhew in 2011 and the couple have two children, a son named Rhett Lee born February 25, 2015, and a daughter named Eliza Grace born September 18, 2016.

Motorsports career results

NASCAR
(key) (Bold – Pole position awarded by qualifying time. Italics – Pole position earned by points standings or practice time. * – Most laps led.)

Monster Energy Cup Series

Daytona 500

Xfinity Series

Camping World Truck Series

West Series 

 Season still in progress
 Ineligible for series points

References

 Smith earns his break

External links

 
 

Living people
1983 births
People from Cayuga County, New York
Racing drivers from New York (state)
NASCAR drivers
CARS Tour drivers
World Karting Association drivers
Dale Earnhardt Inc. drivers
Hendrick Motorsports drivers
JR Motorsports drivers
Stewart-Haas Racing drivers
Richard Childress Racing drivers
Joe Gibbs Racing drivers
Chip Ganassi Racing drivers